Sheila Forshaw (born 28 June 1958 in Toronto) is a Canadian former field hockey player who competed in the 1984 Summer Olympics and in the 1988 Summer Olympics.

References

External links
 
 
 
 

1958 births
Living people
Canadian female field hockey players
Olympic field hockey players of Canada
Field hockey players at the 1984 Summer Olympics
Field hockey players at the 1988 Summer Olympics
Field hockey players from Toronto
20th-century Canadian women
21st-century Canadian women